William Thomas Goodge (28 September 1862 – 28 November 1909) was an English writer and journalist, who arrived in Australia in 1882, after jumping ship in Sydney. He worked in various jobs in New South Wales, including as a coal-miner, until he was engaged to write for "The Tribune" in North Sydney, a small weekly associated with the "Daily Telegraph". From there he was chosen by Harry Newman (Member of Parliament and newspaper proprietor) to edit "The Leader" newspaper in Orange, NSW. Goodge remained in Orange, becoming part-owner of "The Leader" at some point, until in the early 1900s he returned to Sydney and began writing for that city's newspapers, especially "The Sunday Times".

Goodge was first married on 21 January 1892. His wife died 3 January 1895 of typhoid, leaving behind two children. Sometime later he remarried and had another child.  Goodge died on 28 November 1909 in North Sydney.

During his writing career, Goodge wrote mainly light-verse poems and short stories.  Although he did have one novel, The Fortunes of Fenchurch, serialised in the pages of The Sunday Times, the book was never published separately. His best known works were "The Great Australian Adjective", and "The Oozlum Bird".

Norman Lindsay, who illustrated the reprint volume of Goodge's only poetry collection, considered the poet better than C. J. Dennis. "Goodge, with his Hits! Skits! and Jingles!, is a much better light-verse writer than Dennis, and his book should be reprinted."

Novels
 The Fortunes of Fenchurch, 1906

Collections
 Hits! Skits! and Jingles!, 1899

Individual poems

 "The Great Australian Adjective" (1897)
 "The Oozlum Bird" (1897)
 "Daley's Dorg Wattle" (1898)
 "Mulligan's Shanty" (1898)

External links

Obituary:
A.G. Stephens

References

1862 births
1909 deaths
20th-century Australian novelists
Australian male novelists
Australian male short story writers
Australian male poets
19th-century Australian poets
English emigrants to colonial Australia
19th-century Australian short story writers
19th-century male writers
20th-century Australian short story writers
20th-century Australian male writers
19th-century Australian novelists